Kim Heung-soo (born May 19, 1983) is a South Korean actor. He is best known for his roles in television series, such as Love & Secret (2014–2015) and Gracious Revenge (2019–2020).

Filmography

Film

Television

Music video

Awards and nominations

References

External links
 
 

1983 births
Living people
South Korean male film actors
South Korean male television actors
Male actors from Seoul
21st-century South Korean male actors